The 2013 Oceania Sevens Championship was the sixth Oceania Sevens in men's rugby sevens. It was held at ANZ Stadium in Suva, Fiji.

Samoa won the Oceania Sevens Championship by defeating Fiji 31-17.  Cook Islands and American Samoa, as the two highest finishers excluding core teams Fiji, Australia and Samoa, qualified for the 2013 Hong Kong Sevens and the opportunity later to qualify for the 2013–14 IRB Sevens World Series.

Pool Stage

Pool A

Pool B

Knockout stage

Plate

Cup

Final standings

References

2013
2013 in Fijian rugby union
2013 rugby sevens competitions
Sport in Suva
2013 in Oceanian rugby union
International rugby union competitions hosted by Fiji